Oman competed at the 2000 Summer Olympics in Sydney, Australia.

Results by event

Athletics
Men's 200 m
Mohamed Al Hooch
 Round 1 – 21.19 (→ did not advance, 48th place)

Men's 4 × 100 m
 Mohamed Said Al-Maskary, Hamoud Abdallah Al-Dalhami, Mohamed Al-Houti, Jahad Abdullah Al-Sheikh
 Round 1 – 39.82 (→ did not advance, 28th place)

Swimming
Men's 50 m freestyle
Khalid Al Kulaks
 Preliminary Heat – 26.96 (→ did not advance, 68th place)

References
Wallenstein, David (2004). The Complete Book of the Summer Olympics (Athens 2004 Edition). Toronto, Canada. . 
International Olympic Committee (2001). The Results. Retrieved 12 November 2005.
Sydney Organizing Committee for the Olympic Games (2001). Official Report of the XXVII Olympiad Volume 1: Preparing for the Games. Retrieved 20 November 2005.
Sydney Organizing Committee for the Olympic Games (2001). Official Report of the XXVII Olympiad Volume 2: Celebrating the Games. Retrieved 20 November 2005.
Sydney Organizing Committee for the Olympic Games (2001). The Results. Retrieved 20 November 2005.
International Olympic Committee Web Site

Nations at the 2000 Summer Olympics
2000
2000 in Omani sport